Sphingopyxis flava is a Gram-staining, aerobic, non-spore-forming, rod-shaped and non-motile bacterium from the genus of Sphingopyxis which has been isolated from soil from a dumpsite which was contaminated with hexachlorocyclohexane from Ummari in India.

References

Sphingomonadales
Bacteria described in 2015